Rawatpur is a suburb in North Kanpur, India, situated about 10 km from Kanpur on the NH 91 to Delhi. The population was 110,000 at the 2001 census. It has 84% of literacy and is 5 km from Kalyanpur. It also Comes under Kanpur metropolitan area.

Transport

Rawatpur has a bus station and UPSRTC Busses of Kanpur have routes from Rawatpur to different localities. Rawatpur has a railway station on the Kanpur-Mathura line. Kanpur Airport is the nearest airport.

Tourist attractions

J K Temple
Rave@Moti Mall
Gurudev Palace
Indian Institute of Pulses Research
Allen Forest Zoo
Moti Jheel
Geeta Nagar Stadium
 Ramlala Mandir Rawatpur Gaon

See also
Kalianpur
Bithoor

References

Neighbourhoods in Kanpur